Stuart Loughrey (born 20 February 1991) is an Ireland men's field hockey international. He played for Ireland at the 2018 Men's Hockey World Cup.

Early years, family and education
Loughrey's mother and his brothers, Mark and David, all played field hockey. Loughrey was educated at St. Andrew's College and Loughborough University. He is a qualified PE teacher. In 2015 he began working at West London Free School. Mark Loughrey is also an Ireland international and also played for Pembroke Wanderers.

Domestic teams

St. Andrew's College
In 2008 Loughrey helped St. Andrew's College win the All Ireland Schoolboys Hockey Championship after defeating Wesley College 2–1 in the final.

Pembroke Wanderers
Loughrey, together with David Harte, Conor Harte, Ronan Gormley, Justin Sheriff, Alan Sothern and Craig Fulton, was a member of the Pembroke Wanderers that won two successive Irish Senior Cup finals in 2007–08 and 2008–09. In 2008–09 Loughrey also helped Wanderers win the Men's Irish Hockey League title.

Men's England Hockey League
After moving to England to study at Loughborough University, Loughrey subsequently went on to play for several clubs in the Men's England Hockey League, including Loughborough Students, Team Bath Buccaneers, Cannock, Hampstead & Westminster and 
Reading.

Ireland international
Loughrey captained Ireland at Under-18 level    before making his senior debut in April 2011 during a series of matches against Canada. Loughrey was a member of the Ireland team that won the 2011 Men's Hockey Champions Challenge II. He also represented Ireland at the 2013 Men's EuroHockey Nations Championship, scoring a goal in a 3–3 draw with the Czech Republic. In June 2017 Loughrey was a member of the Ireland team that won the Hamburg Masters, defeating Germany 4–2 in the final. He also represented Ireland at the  2018 Men's Hockey World Cup.

Honours
Ireland
Men's Hockey Champions Challenge II
Winners: 2011
Hamburg Masters
Winners: 2017 
Men's FIH Hockey World League Round 2
Runners up: 2013 New Delhi
Men's Field Hockey Olympic Qualifier
Runners up: 2012
Men's Hockey Investec Cup
Runners up: 2014
Reading
EH Men's Championship Cup
Winners: 2017–18: 1 
Pembroke Wanderers
Men's Irish Hockey League
Winners: 2008–09
Irish Senior Cup
Winners: 2007–08, 2008–09: 2
St. Andrew's College
All Ireland Schoolboys Hockey Championship
Winners: 2008

References

1991 births
Living people
Irish male field hockey players
Male field hockey defenders
2018 Men's Hockey World Cup players
Pembroke Wanderers Hockey Club players
Men's Irish Hockey League players
Loughborough Students field hockey players
Team Bath Buccaneers Hockey Club players
Cannock Hockey Club players
Hampstead & Westminster Hockey Club players
Reading Hockey Club players
Men's England Hockey League players
Irish expatriate sportspeople in England
Field hockey players from County Dublin
People educated at St Andrew's College, Dublin
Alumni of Loughborough University
Irish schoolteachers
Ireland international men's field hockey players